The Immunization Alliance is an American vaccine advocacy consortium, assembled under the auspices of the American Academy of Pediatrics (AAP) in May 2008. The Immunization Alliance has called for a governmental information campaign, ongoing research into vaccine safety and efficacy, balanced media coverage, and restoration of confidence among parents due to vaccine hesitancy and the related controversies in autism.

Formation
Citing the largest measles outbreak in the United States since 1966 (130 cases in fifteen states), Paul Offit, a member of the Alliance, asserted that this re-emergence of a common childhood disease was a warning about the dangers of "what can happen when parents are misinformed about vaccine safety. "We do not want to become a nation of people who are vulnerable to diseases that are deadly or that can have serious complications, especially if those diseases can be prevented," said Renee Jenkins, president of the AAP.
The Immunization Alliance's debut was announced in the July 2008 issue of Pediatrics (published by the AAP), which also detailed its plans for improving vaccine schedule adherence and combating declining immunization rates.

Stated goals
The Immunization Alliance's stated goals include increasing public education about vaccines by both public health organizations and individual physicians, and increasing federal funding and media coverage surrounding the science of vaccine safety.

Member organizations

Over twenty organizations form the Immunization Alliance, including:

 American Academy of Family Physicians
 American Academy of Pediatrics
 American Academy of Physician Assistants
 American College of Preventive Medicine
 American College of Obstetricians and Gynecologists
 American College of Osteopathic Pediatricians
 American Medical Association
 American Public Health Association 
 America's Health Insurance Plans
 Association of State and Territorial Health Officials
 California Immunization Coalition
 Every Child By Two
 Immunization Action Coalition
 Indiana Immunization Coalition
 Infectious Diseases Society of America
 March of Dimes
 National Foundation for Infectious Diseases
 National Vaccine Program Office
 Parents of Kids with Infectious Diseases
 Pediatric Infectious Diseases Society
 Sabin Vaccine Institute
 UnitedHealth Group
 Vaccine Education Center at the Children's Hospital of Philadelphia
 Voices for Vaccines

References

External links
 AAP.org - "New Immunization Alliance Issues National Call to Action', American Academy of Pediatrics (Sept. 18, 2008)

2008 establishments in the United States
Public health organizations
Vaccination-related organizations
Health and disability rights organizations in the United States
Organizations established in 2008
Vaccination in the United States